Timber Creek High School may refer to:
Timber Creek High School (Florida)
Timber Creek High School (Texas)
Timber Creek Regional High School (New Jersey)